Paulo Baptista Nsimba (born 12 October 1983), nicknamed Zé Kalanga, is an Angolan former footballer who played as a winger.

Career
Also known as Ricardo Eloy he began his career at Angolan club Petro Atletico in his hometown of Luanda. He made his debut for the Angolan national team in 2003 against Gabon. His bright and promising performances for Angola on the right wing at the 2006 World Cup earned him a move to Romanian club Dinamo București where in his first season he was part of the Liga I Championship winning squad.

At the World Cup Zé Kalanga was voted Man of the Match in Angola's group game against Iran on 21 June, in a game where he set up teammate Flávio's opening goal in a 1–1 draw.

In June 2006 he did not attend Dinamo's pre-season reunion after the summer break. Following this he was loaned out to Portuguese side Boavista for the duration of the 2007–08 season.

He was named in the Angolan squad for the 2008 African Cup of Nations in Ghana where he came on as a substitute in the Angolans' first game against South Africa. His impressive performance earned him a recall to the starting eleven for the second game against Senegal where he played the full 90 minute in sterling style, setting up striker Manucho's headed goal during his sides 3–1 victory.

Honours
Dinamo București
Liga I: 2006–07

References

External links
Girabola.com – Zé Kalanga
Zé Kalanga joins Dinamo
Zé Kalanga at CNN

1983 births
Living people
Angolan footballers
Angola international footballers
FC Dinamo București players
2006 FIFA World Cup players
2006 Africa Cup of Nations players
2008 Africa Cup of Nations players
2010 Africa Cup of Nations players
Expatriate footballers in Romania
Angolan expatriate sportspeople in Romania
Liga I players
Boavista F.C. players
Primeira Liga players
Footballers from Luanda
Atlético Petróleos de Luanda players
2011 African Nations Championship players
Association football wingers
Angola A' international footballers